Gò Dầu is a rural district in the south of Tây Ninh province, Southeast region, Vietnam. In 2003, the district had a population of 140,661. The district covers an area of 251 km². The district capital is Gò Dầu Town.

References

Districts of Tây Ninh province